TDE may refer to:
 Dichlorodiphenyldichloroethane (Tetrachlorodiphenylethane), an insecticide
 Telefónica de España, London Stock Exchange symbol
 The Daily Edited, an Australian luxury fashion brand specialising in monogrammable leather goods
 The Dark Eye, a role-playing game
 Tidal disruption event, an astronomical phenomenon near a supermassive black hole
 Top Dawg Entertainment, a record label
 Total Direct Énergie (cycling team), a UCI Continental Circuits cycling team
 Transparent data encryption, a technique to encrypt database content
 Trinity Desktop Environment, an offshoot of the KDE 3.5 desktop environment